The San Gregorio Formation is a lithostratigraphic unit dating back to the Pliocene to Pleistocene of Venezuela. The formation is split into three members, the older Vergel Member (Late Pliocene to earliest Pleistocene), the Cocuiza Member (Pleistocene) and the Río Seco Member. During this time the region is thought to have been covered by a mixed environment of open grassland and forested areas surrounding a permanent freshwater system. The diverse fauna of the San Gregorio Formation, including a variety of freshwater fish, crocodilians, turtles and snakes, also includes many mammals interpreted to have been part of the first major wave of the Great American Interchange in addition to native clades such as glyptodonts, ground sloths and caviomorph rodents.

Stratigraphy
The San Gregorio Formation overlies the Codore Formation and forms the most recent sequence of the stratigraphic section. Outcrops of this formation are found in Falcón State, northeast of the town of Urumaco. The formation is named for the town of San Gregorio, Venezuela.

Robert Masterman Stainforth divided the San Gregorio Formation into three subsections. The oldest of these is the Vergel Member, composed of 260 meters of sandstone, mudstone and sparse conglomerates. In their study on the formation Carrillo-Briceño and colleagues determined a late Pliocene to earliest Pleistocene age. Overlying the Vergel Member is the Cocuiza Member, a sequence of 80 meters composed of sandstone, mudstone and limestone. Using strontium dating, an age between 0.709100 and 0.709342 Ma was determined for the Cocuiza Member. Some samples utilized suggested that they had been chemically altered, while two localities yielded an early Pleistocene age. The third member recognized by Stainforth is the Rio Seco Member, however it has not been dated by the 2021 study by Carrillo-Briceño and colleagues.

Paleoenvironment

The fish fauna of the Vergel Member, showcasing a great abundance of catfish in particular, clearly shows that permanent rivers played a vital part in the environment of the Pliocene San Gregorio Formation. The stingray Potamotrygon in particular is commonly associated with flowing waters and sandy banks, although it can also be found in still waters. Overall the depositional environment may have been consisting of floodplains and braided rivers alongside a series of other environments. Swamps, ponds and flooded areas for instance are also possible and may have been home to armored catfish and swamp eels, whose modern members are known to inhabit oxygen-poor bodies of water. Aside from freshwater fish, some fossils also indicate the presence of animal's capable of tolerating a wider range of salt (such as Sciades), possibly indicating a proximity to marine environments. The presence of foraminiferans with low tolerance for saltwater supports this, suggesting that the region also featured estuaries. Frogs, podocnemidid turtles and caimans are all indicative of freshwater environments of varying nature, while Crocodylus falconensis could have easily inhabited areas closer to the coast. Matamata turtes meanwhile are generally associated with slow moving waters, marshes and swamps. Other animals found in the Vergel Member associated with bodies of water include freshwater molluscs and crabs, the False Coral Snake which requires humid soil and prehistoric relatives of the Capybara. This highly diverse fauna indicates that the Vergel member heavily featured permanent bodies of freshwater, likely rivers, as well as other slower moving bodies of water such as swamps, marshes and/or ponds.

The terrestrial fauna features a variety of endemic South American mammals ranging from notoungulates, ground sloths, glyptodonts to smaller types of armadillos. These animals would suggest a forested-grassland environment, with the presence of the genus Corallus, a tree boa, clearly indicating the presence of forested areas. This is supported by the palynoflora, which shows the presence of plants associated with rainforests. However, the general size of seeds and fruits found in the Norte Casa Chiguaje locality is more in-line with open environments, ultimately suggesting an environment featuring both forested areas as well as more open grassland.

The Cocuiza Member meanwhile represents a mostly marine environment following marine incurions in northern South America. The presence of sharks, echinoderms, oyster colonies and marine gastropods suggests a coastal setting. Fossils of terrestrial and freshwater fauna discovered in the San Gregorio Oeste del Pueblo (SGOP) Locality has been interpreted to represent carcasses that were washed into the ocean by streams and rivers of the backshore, supported by the disarticulated and fragmentary nature of most remains found in the Cocuiza Member. However, the fauna discovered in this member suggests that an environment similar to that of the older Vergel Member (forested grassland mixed with wetlands or permanent freshwater habitats) was found further inland, providing the locality with its freshwater and terrestrial fossil remains.

The rainforest taxa recovered from the Vergel Member's flora are absent from the Cocuiza Member, suggesting that drying climate during the Pliocene-Pleistocene transition caused a great turnover in the flora of the northern neotropics.

The composition of the Rio Seco Member suggests a fluvial environment.

Paleoflora

Paleofauna

Molluscs

Crustaceans

Echinoderms

Fish

Amphibians

Reptilians

Mammals

References

Geologic formations of Venezuela
Pliocene Series of South America
Neogene Venezuela
Quaternary Venezuela
Fossiliferous stratigraphic units of South America
Paleontology in Venezuela
Sandstone formations
Mudstone formations
Lacustrine deposits